The 2011 Trans-Am Series was the 43rd season of the Sports Car Club of America's Trans-Am Series, a class of racing that straddles the line between sports car and stock car auto racing.

The 2011 schedule consisted of races on 8 road courses and one temporary street circuit. It was the first season that utilized the new multi-class format. The TA1 class is for the previous spec of Trans-Am cars. The TA2 class was added for cars that meet SCCA GT2-class specifications. These cars were primarily stock cars, some of which have been rebodied with pony car bodywork. A third class, TA3, for cars meeting SCCA GT3-class specifications was announced, which mainly consisted of smaller and lower-powered sports cars than TA1. However, there were no TA3 entries in 2011. For the final race of the season, a new class, Global GT (GGT) was introduced for production-based sports cars.

2010 champ Tony Ave won 6 of the 9 races to repeat as champion. Bob Stretch won the TA2 class in 5 of the 7 races he contested to win the inaugural TA2 championship.

Although she was not the first woman to compete in the Trans-Am Series (Janet Guthrie, 1978), Amy Ruman became the first one in the series' 45-year history to win a race, accomplishing the feat in the season finale at Road Atlanta.

The event at Miller is thus far the only post-hiatus Trans Am event in the Western United States.

Schedule

Driver standings

TA1

TA2

References 

Trans-Am Series
Trans-Am